Motor City Resurrection is an album by Finnish rock band The 69 Eyes, released in 1994. Although often listed as a studio album, it is a compilation of the band's early 7" singles and EPs. It even features a cover of Gimme Some Head, originally by  the cult shock rocker GG Allin and MC5's Wayne Kramer. In 2007, the album was re-released on Cleopatra Records for distribution within the US. The re-released version includes additional cover songs and two original songs from previous singles, EPs, and tribute albums.

Track listing 
 "Discipline" – 3:17
 "Deuce" (KISS cover) – 2:57
 "Mrs. Sleazy" – 3:45
 "Hot Butterfly" – 5:01
 "Sugarman" – 2:29
 "Stop Bitching!" – 2:54
 "Barbarella" – 3:07
 "Gimme Some Skin" (The Stooges cover) – 3:02
 "Juicy Lucy" – 3:41
 "The Hills Have Eyes" – 3:09
 "Too Itching for Action" – 3:06
 "No Hesitation" – 3:43
 "Alive!" – 2:39
 "Gimme Some Head" (GG Allin cover) – 3:06
Bonus tracks
 "One-Shot Woman" – 3:18
 "TV Eye" (The Stooges cover) – 3:51
 "Motormouth" – 3:04
 "Return of the Fly" (Misfits cover) – 2:03
 "Is It My Body" (Alice Cooper cover) – 2:52
 "Call Me Animal" (MC5 cover) – 2:10
 "Vietnamese Baby" (With Andy McCoy) (New York Dolls cover) – 3:36
 "Science Gone Too Far" (The Dictators cover) 4:04

EPs 
High Times-Low Life
"Mrs. Sleazy"
"Discipline"
"Stop Bitching!"

Never Too Loud!!!
"Too Iching for Action"
"Call Me Animal"

Deuce AKA Suck My Mick!
"Deuce"
"Is It My Body"

The 69 Eyes & Backyard Babies: Supershow Split

Backyard Babies: "Mommy's Little Monster" (Social Distortion cover)
The 69 Eyes: "One-Shot Woman"

Tributes 
Dictators Forever, Forever Dictators (tribute to The Dictators)
"The 69 Eyes: "Science Gone Too Far!""

I Wanna Be a Stooges (tribute to The Stooges)
"The 69 Eyes: "Gimme Some Skin""

Hell on Earth: A Tribute to the Misfits
"The 69 Eyes: "Return of the Fly""

Stranded in the Doll's House (tribute to the New York Dolls)
"The 69 Eyes & Andy McCoy: "Vietnamese Baby""

Personnel 
J. Darling – vocals
Bazie – lead guitar
Timo-Timo – rhythm guitar
Archzie – bass
Jussi – drums

References 

1994 albums
The 69 Eyes albums